NRK P13 is a digital radio channel operated by the Norwegian Broadcasting Corporation (NRK). Launched on 28 January 2014, it is a music-based station playing mainly rock and indie music presented in a light-hearted style and aimed chiefly at listeners who consider themselves to be "too old for P3 but also too young for P1".
 
The channel is broadcast nationwide on DAB radio as well as being available via digital television and on online.

References

External links 
 NRK P13 online radio

2014 establishments in Norway
NRK
Radio stations established in 2014
Radio stations in Norway
Indie music
Rock radio stations